The Bell P-59 Airacomet was a single-seat, twin jet-engine fighter aircraft that was designed and built by Bell Aircraft during World War II, the first produced in the United States. As the British were further along in jet engine development, they donated an engine for the United States to copy in 1941 that became the basis for the General Electric J31 jet engine used by the P-59 a year later. Because the plane was underpowered, the United States Army Air Forces (USAAF) was not impressed by its performance and canceled half of the original order for 100 fighters, using the completed aircraft as trainers. The USAAF would instead go on to select the Lockheed P-80 Shooting Star as its first operational jet fighter. Although no P-59s entered combat, the aircraft paved the way for later generations of U.S. turbojet-powered aircraft.

Design and development

Major General Henry H. "Hap" Arnold became aware of the UK's jet program when he attended a taxiing demonstration of the Gloster E.28/39 in April 1941. The subject had been mentioned, but not in-depth, as part of the Tizard Mission the previous year. He requested and was given, the plans for the aircraft's powerplant, the Power Jets W.1, which he took back to the U.S. He also arranged for an example of the engine, the Whittle W.1X turbojet, to be flown to the U.S. on 1 October in a Consolidated B-24 Liberator, along with drawings for the more powerful W.2B/23 engine and a small team of Power Jets engineers. On 4 September, he offered the U.S. company General Electric a contract to produce an American version of the engine, which subsequently became the General Electric I-A. On the following day, he approached Lawrence Dale Bell, head of Bell Aircraft Corporation, to build a fighter to utilize it. Bell agreed and set to work on producing three prototypes. As a disinformation tactic, the USAAF gave the project the designation P-59A, to suggest it was a development of the unrelated Bell XP-59 fighter project which had been canceled. The design was finalized on 9 January 1942, and construction began. In March, long before the prototypes were completed, an order for 13 YP-59A pre-production aircraft was added to the contract.

The P-59A had an oval cross-section, all-metal stressed skin semi-monocoque fuselage that housed a single pressurized cockpit. The mid-mounted, straight wing had two spars plus a false spar in the inner panel. The electrically-powered tricycle landing gear was attached to the center spar. The pair of General Electric J31 turbojets were positioned under the wing roots in streamlined nacelles. The armament was located in the nose of the aircraft; two of the three XP-59As and most of the YP-59As had a pair of  M10 autocannon. Later aircraft, including the production models, had one M10 autocannon and three  AN/M2 Browning heavy machine guns. Both production models could carry  drop tanks under the wings. In addition, the P-59B was provided with a  fuel tank in each outer wing panel.

The crated prototype had been built on the second floor of a disused Pierce-Arrow factory, but its components were too big to fit through any elevator and required a hole to be broken in the brick outer wall to remove the first XP-59A. It was shipped to Muroc Army Air Field (today, Edwards Air Force Base) in California on 12 September 1942 by train for flight testing. The aircraft first became airborne during high-speed taxiing tests on 1 October with Bell test pilot Robert Stanley at the controls, although the first official flight was made by Colonel Laurence Craigie the next day. While being handled on the ground, the aircraft was fitted with a dummy propeller to disguise its true nature. When heavy rains flooded Rogers Dry Lake at Muroc in March 1943, the second prototype was towed  to Hawes Field, an auxiliary airfield of Victorville Army Airfield, later George Air Force Base, over a public road. After one flight on 11 March, security concerns caused the jet to be transferred to nearby Harper Lake where it remained until 7 April.

Five of the Airacomets, a pair of XP-59As, two YP-59As, and a P-59B had open-air flight observer cockpits (similar to those of biplanes) fitted in the nose with a small windscreen, replacing the armament bay. The XP-59As were used for flight demonstrations and testing, but one of the latter pair was used as a "mother ship" for the other modified YP-59A during  remote control trials in late 1944 and early 1945. After the drone crashed during take-off on 23 March, a P-59B was modified to serve as its replacement. During diving trials in 1944, one YP-59A was forced to make a belly landing and another crashed when its entire empennage broke away.

The performance was greatly hampered by the insufficient thrust from its engines that was far below expectations. The Army Air Force conducted combat trials against propeller-driven Lockheed P-38J Lightning and Republic P-47D Thunderbolt fighters in February 1944 and found that the older aircraft outperformed the jet. It, therefore, decided that the P-59 was best suited as a training aircraft to familiarize pilots with jet-engine aircraft.  

Even as deliveries of the YP-59As began in July 1943, the USAAF had placed a preliminary order for 100 production machines as the P-59A Airacomet, the name having been chosen by Bell employees. This was confirmed on 11 March 1944 but was later cut to 50 aircraft on 10 October after the procurement bureaucracy had digested the earlier evaluation.

Operational service

The 13 service test YP-59As had a more powerful engine than their predecessor, the General Electric J31, but the performance improvement was negligible, with top speed increased by only 5  mph and a reduction in the time they could be used before an overhaul was needed.  One of these aircraft, the third YP-59A (S/n: 42-108773) was supplied to the Royal Air Force (receiving British serial RJ362/G), in exchange for the first production Gloster Meteor I, EE210/G. British pilots found that the aircraft compared very unfavorably with the jets that they were already flying.  Two YP-59A Airacomets (42-108778 and 42-100779) were also delivered to the U.S. Navy where they were evaluated as the "YF2L-1" but were quickly found completely unsuitable for carrier operations. Three P-59Bs were transferred to the Navy in 1945–1946, although they kept their designations. The Navy used all five of its jets as trainers and for flight testing.

Faced with their own ongoing difficulties, Bell eventually completed 50 production Airacomets, 20 P-59As and 30 P-59Bs; deliveries of P-59As took place in the fall of 1944. The P-59Bs were assigned to the 412th Fighter Group to familiarize AAF pilots with the handling and performance characteristics of jet aircraft. While the P-59 was not a great success, the type did give the USAAF and the USN experience with the operation of jet aircraft, in preparation for the more advanced types that would shortly become available.

Variants

 XP-59
Unrelated piston engine-powered pusher-propeller design developed from the Bell XP-52. Not built.
 XP-59A
 Prototype of the new jet engine-powered aircraft, three built, serial numbers 42-108784/108786.
 YP-59A
 Series of test aircraft, 13 built, serial numbers 42-108771/108783. 
 YF2L-1
 Two YP-59A (42-108778/108779) delivered to the US Navy for carrier evaluation as Bu63960/63961. 
P-59A
 First production version, 20 built, serial numbers 44-22609/22628. Redesignated ZF-59A in June 1948.
 XP-59B 
Study for a single-engined P-59A.
P-59B
 Improved P-59A. 80 aircraft ordered but only 30 built, serial numbers 44-22629/22658, further 50 (44-22659/22708) canceled. Redesignated ZF-59B in June 1948.

Operators

Royal Air Force received one aircraft, becoming RJ362/G, in exchange for a Gloster Meteor I EE210/G.

United States Army Air Forces
412th Fighter Group
29th Fighter Squadron
31st Fighter Squadron
445th Fighter Squadron
United States Navy

Surviving aircraft

Six P-59s are known to survive today.

On display:
 XP-59A
42-108784 – National Air and Space Museum in Washington, DC.
 P-59A
44-22614 – March Field Air Museum, March Air Reserve Base (former March AFB) in Riverside, California.
P-59B
44-22633 – Edwards AFB.
44-22656 – Pioneer Village (Nebraska) in Minden, Nebraska.
44-22650 – National Museum of the United States Air Force at Wright-Patterson Air Force Base near Dayton, Ohio.

Under restoration:
 YP-59A
42-108777 – As of 2020, being restored to flying condition with General Electric J31 engines by the Planes of Fame Museum in Chino, California.

Specifications (P-59B)

See also

References

Notes

Bibliography
 "Airacomet... A Jet Pioneer by Bell". Air International, Vol. 18 No. 3, March 1980, pp. 132–139. Bromley, UK: Fine Scroll. .
 Angelucci, Enzo and Peter Bowers. The American Fighter. Yeovil, UK: Haynes, 1987. .
 
 Pace, Steve. Bell P-59 Airacomet. Air Force Legends Number 208. Ginter Books, Simi Valley, California, 2000. .
 Pelletier, Alan J. Bell Aircraft Since 1935. Annapolis, Maryland: Naval Institute Press, 1992. .

Further reading
 Carpenter, David M. Flame Powered: The Bell XP-59A Airacomet and the General Electric I-A Engine. Boston: Jet Pioneers of America, 1992. .
 Jenkins, Dennis R. and Tony R. Landis. Experimental & Prototype U.S. Air Force Jet Fighters. North Branch, Minnesota, USA: Specialty Press, 2008. .

External links

 Bell XP-59A Airacomet – National Air and Space Museum
 P-59A Airacomet – March Field Air Museum
 Bell P-59B Airacomet – National Museum of the United States Air Force
 America's First Jet Flight, October 1942 – Aircraft Owner Online
 "How The First U.S. Jet Was Born" – Popular Science

P-059
1940s United States fighter aircraft
 World War II jet aircraft of the United States
 Twinjets
Aircraft first flown in 1942